Pandu Havaldar is a 1975 Marathi-language film.

Cast
Dada Kondke as Pandu Havaldar
Ashok Saraf
Usha Chavan
Ruhi Berde
Mohan Kotivan.

Script
Rajesh Mujumdar

Music 

The movie soundtrack has 6 songs composed by Raamlaxman.

References

External links 
 

1970s Marathi-language films